The Kingston Panthers are an English basketball club, based in the city of Hull, East Riding of Yorkshire.

History
The Panthers were founded in November 2011, competing in the local Humber Basketball League. Based at Bishop Burton College, the team was composed of local players from Hull and surrounding areas as well as players from the college. During the 2012/13 season, the Panthers merged with another local team, East Hull Harriers, allowing the club to field a reserve team, as well as taking on a robust and thriving junior setup boasting an under 13's and under 16's team. Following a second season in the local leagues, director Karl Buitendam declared his intention for the team to enter into the English Basketball League system for the 2013/14 season.

Following a successful first season in the National League, the loss of a major sponsor forced the Panthers to withdraw part way through the 2014-15 season. The club however was able to re-enter the following season.

The Panthers, as well as Senior Men's and Women's teams in the NBL, now run multiple junior, wheelchair and over 50s basketball programmes.

Home Venue
The Panthers are based at the Hull Trinity House Academy in the city. They previously played home games at the Hull Arena.

Season-by-season records

References

Basketball teams in England